Gustáv Husák (10 January 1913 – 18 November 1991) was a Czechoslovak politician who served as the long-time  First Secretary of the Communist Party of Czechoslovakia from 1969 to 1987 and the President of Czechoslovakia from 1975 to 1989. 

His rule is known for the period of Normalization after the Prague Spring.

Early life 
Gustáv Husák was born as a son of an unemployed worker in Pozsonyhidegkút, Kingdom of Hungary, Austria-Hungary (now Bratislava-Dúbravka, Slovakia). He joined the Communist Youth Union at the age of sixteen while studying at the grammar school in Bratislava.

In 1933, when he started his studies at the Law Faculty of the Comenius University in Bratislava, he joined the Communist Party of Czechoslovakia (KSČ) which was banned from 1938 to 1945. During World War II, he was periodically jailed by the Jozef Tiso government for illegal Communist activities, and he was one of the leaders of the 1944 Slovak National Uprising against Nazi Germany and Tiso. Husák was a member of the Presidium of the Slovak National Council from 1 to 5 September 1944.

After the war, he began a career as a government official in Slovakia and party functionary in Czechoslovakia. From 1946 to 1950, he was the head of the devolved administration of Slovakia, and as such he strongly contributed to the liquidation of the anti-communist Christian democratic Democratic Party of Slovakia. The Democratic Party of Slovakia established in 1944 had taken 62% in the 1946 elections in Slovakia (whereas in the Czech part of the republic of then-Czechoslovakia, the clear winners were the Communists), thus complicating the Communist ambitions for a swift taking of power. Husák's loyalty to the central organs of the Czechoslovak Communist party as well as his considerable talent for body politics and a ruthless approach to political opponents contributed largely to the crushing of the Democratic Party's dissent in Slovakia and releasing the popular opinion in the country to the whims of prevailing political currents.

In 1950, he fell victim to a Stalinist purge of the party leadership, and was sentenced to life imprisonment, spending the years from 1954 to 1960 in the Leopoldov Prison. A convinced Communist, he always viewed his imprisonment as a gross misunderstanding, which he periodically stressed in several letters of appeal addressed to the party leadership. It is generally acknowledged that the then party leader and president Antonín Novotný repeatedly declined to pardon Husák, assuring his comrades that "you do not know what he is capable of if he comes to power".

As part of the De-Stalinization period in Czechoslovakia, Husák's conviction was overturned and his party membership restored in 1963. By 1967, he had become a critic of Novotný and the KSČ's neo-Stalinist leadership. In April 1968, during the Prague Spring under new party leader and fellow Slovak Alexander Dubček, Husák became a vice-premier of Czechoslovakia, responsible for overseeing reforms in Slovakia.

Leader of Czechoslovakia 
As the Soviet Union grew increasingly alarmed by Dubček's liberal reforms in 1968 (Prague Spring), Husák, originally Dubček's ally and a moderate supporter of the reform programme, began calling for caution.

After the Soviets invaded Czechoslovakia in August, Husák  participated in the Czechoslovak-Soviet negotiations between the kidnapped Dubček and Leonid Brezhnev in Moscow. Husák changed course and became a leader among those party members calling for the reversal of Dubček's reforms. An account for his pragmatism was given in one of his official speeches in Slovakia after the 1968 events, during which he ventured a rhetorical question, asking where the opponents of the Soviet Union wished to find allies of Czechoslovakia that might come to support the country against Soviet troops.

Supported by Moscow, he was appointed leader of the Communist Party of Slovakia in as early as August 1968, and he succeeded Dubček as first secretary (title changed to general secretary in 1971) of the Communist Party of Czechoslovakia in April 1969. He reversed Dubček's reforms and purged the party of its liberal members in 1969–1971. In 1975, Husák was elected President of Czechoslovakia. During the two decades of Husák's leadership, Czechoslovakia became one of Moscow's most loyal allies.

In the first years following the invasion, Husák managed to appease the outraged civil population by providing a relatively satisfactory living standard and avoiding any overt reprisals like was the case in the 1950s. His regime was not a complete return to the heavy-handed Stalinism that prevailed during the first 20 years of Communist rule in the country. At the same time, the people's rights were somewhat more restricted than was the case in János Kádár's Hungary and Josip Broz Tito's Yugoslavia. Indeed, on the cultural level, the level of repression approached that seen in Erich Honecker's East Germany and even Nicolae Ceauşescu's Romania. There was a campaign of repression by the secret police (StB) targeting dissidents represented later by Charter 77 as well as hundreds of unknown individuals who happened to be targets of the StB's pre-emptive strikes. The repression intensified over the years as Husák grew more authoritarian.

Starting in the early 1970s, Husák allowed those who had been purged in the aftermath of Prague Spring to rejoin the party. However, they were required to publicly distance themselves from their past support for reform.

The latter part of Husák's tenure saw a struggle within the Politburo over whether to adopt Gorbachev-style reforms. While the hardliners, led by Vasiľ Biľak, opposed any restructuring, moderates led by Prime Minister Lubomir Strougal strongly favoured reform. Husák himself stayed neutral until April 1987, when he announced a somewhat half-hearted reform program scheduled to start in 1991.

Later that year, however, Husák yielded his post as general secretary to Miloš Jakeš in response to a desire for younger leaders (Jakeš and Ladislav Adamec) to share in power.

On 24 November 1989, the entire Presidum of the Communist Party, including Husák, resigned in the wake of the Velvet Revolution. The party officially abandoned power four days later. On 10 December, Husák swore in a new government. Although it was headed by a communist, Marián Čalfa, it had a non-communist majority–the first in 41 years that was not dominated by communists and/or fellow travelers. He resigned later that day, just hours after presiding over the formal end of the regime he had largely created. In an attempt to rehabilitate its image ahead of the first free elections in 44 years, the Communist Party expelled him in February 1990. 

He died on 18 November 1991, at the age of 78, and was buried at the Cimetière de Dúbravka.

Legacy 

There is still some question about Husák's moral culpability for the last two decades of Communist rule in Czechoslovakia. After its collapse, Husák kept saying that he was just trying to diminish the aftermath of the Soviet invasion and had to constantly resist pressure from hard line Stalinists in the party such as Biľak, Alois Indra and the like. In the early 1970s, he personally pushed for an early withdrawal of the Soviet troops from Czechoslovak territory, which did not happen until 1991; this may be ascribed to his pragmatic attempts to ease the situation and to give an impression that things were leaning toward "normality".

However, there are many ways in which he personally contributed to the Communist government's longevity and policies. As the General Secretary of the Party, he was the nominal leader of the repressive state apparatus. There are many documented cases of appeals from politically persecuted persons, but almost none of them was given Husák's attention. As the overall decay of Czechoslovak society was becoming more and more obvious in the 1980s, Husák became a politically impotent puppet of events.

Gustáv Husák awarded himself the title Hero of the Czechoslovak Socialist Republic three times, in 1969, 1973, and 1982. In 1983 he was awarded the title of Hero of the Soviet Union.

Husák allegedly confessed to a Catholic priest before his death, having previously been an atheist. On his deathbed in 1991, Husák received the sacrament of reconciliation from a Catholic archbishop, Ján Sokol. Author Michal Macháček has argued that the story of the confession is false, and the product of Catholic propaganda.

Awards and honors 
:
 Hero of the Czechoslovak Socialist Republic, thrice (1969, 1972, 1982)
 Order of Klement Gottwald, four times
 Order of Victorious February

:
 Hero of the Soviet Union (1983)
 Orders of Lenin, four times (1969, 1973, 1983, 1988)
 Order of the October Revolution (1978)
 Jubilee Medal "In Commemoration of the 100th Anniversary of the Birth of Vladimir Ilyich Lenin" (1969)

Other countries:
 Grand Cross of the Order of May (Argentina)
 Order of Georgi Dimitrov, twice (Bulgaria)
 Order of the Balkan Mountains (Bulgaria)
 Order of Jose Marti (Cuba)
 Order of Playa Girón (Cuba)
 Order of Karl Marx, twice (East Germany)
 Grand Cross of the White Rose of Finland (Finland)
 Order of the Flag of the Republic of Hungary (Hungary)
 Order of Pahlavi (Iran)
 Order of Sukhbaatar, thrice (Mongolia)
 Order of the National Flag 1st class, twice (North Korea)
 Order of the Grand Cross of the Rebirth of Poland (Poland)
 Order of the Star of the Romanian Socialist Republic 1st class (Romania)
 Order of Victory of Socialism (Romania)
 Order of Civil Merit (Syria)

Functions 
Communist Party of Czechoslovakia/KSČ (prohibited 1938, dissolved 1939–1945)
1933-1938/1939 and 1989(December)-(February)1990: common member
spring 1945: member of its Provisional Central Committee (established in the parts of Czechoslovakia liberated by the Red Army)
1949-1951 and 1968 (31 August)-1989: member of its Central Committee
1968 (31 August)-1989 (24 November): member of its Presidium
1969 (April) -1987 (December): one of its secretaries
1969 (April)-1987: party leader (First Secretary, since 1971  Secretary General of the Central Committee of the Communist Party of Czechoslovakia)
1987 (17 December): resigned as party leader (replaced by Miloš Jakeš)

Communist Party of Slovakia/KSS (illegal 1939–1944/1945)
1939-1945: one of its leaders
1943-1944: member of its 5th illegal Central Committee
1944-1950 and 1968–1971: member of its Central Committee and (except for 1970–1971) member of its Presidium and (except for 1944–1948) one of its secretaries
1944-1945: vice-chairman
1968 (28 August)-1969: party leader ("first secretary")

Slovak National Council (Slovenská národná rada) (during World War II a resistance parliament-government, since 1968 the Slovak parliament)
1943-1944: one of its main organizers
1944-1950 and 1968 (December)-1971: its deputy
1944-1950: member of its Presidium
1944-1945: vice-chairman

Council of Commissioners (Zbor povereníkov) (a quasi government responsible for Slovakia)
1944-1945: Commissioner of the Interior
1945-1946: Commissioner of  Transport and Technology in Slovakia
1946-1950: President of the Council of Commissioners, in which he contributed to the suppression of the influential Democratic Party of Slovakia by the Communists (1947–1948)
1948-1950: Commissioner of Agriculture and Land Reform in Slovakia
1949-1950: Commissioner of Alimentation in Slovakia

Czechoslovak Parliament (called National Assembly and since 1968 Federal Assembly)
1945-1951 and 1968–1975: deputy
1969-1975: member of its Presidium

Czechoslovak government
1968 (April–December): a vice-premier of the Prague Spring Czechoslovak government

President of Czechoslovakia
1975-1989: President of Czechoslovakia
1989 (10 December): resigned as the President of Czechoslovakia within the Velvet Revolution

Other important data 
1929-1932: member of the Communist Youth Union (prohibited in 1932)
1933-1937: studies at the Law Faculty of the Comenius University in Bratislava,
1938 received a title Dr. (of law) and started to work as a lawyer in Bratislava
1936-1938: member of the Slovak Youth Union (1936 founder and secretary)
1937-1938 vice-president of the Slovak Students Union and secretary of the Association for the Economic and Cultural Cooperation with the Soviet Union
1940-1944: four times shortly jailed by the government of Jozef Tiso for illegal Communist activities
1943-1944: member of the 5th illegal KSS Central Committee, one of the main organizers of the anti-Nazi Slovak National Uprising (1944) and of its leading body, the Slovak National Council
late 1944- February 1945: he fled to Moscow after the defeat of the Slovak National Uprising
1950: charged with "bourgeois nationalism" with respect to Slovakia (see History of Czechoslovakia)
1951: arrested
1954: sentenced to life imprisonment
1954-1960: imprisoned
1960: conditionally released through an amnesty
1963: his conviction was overturned and his party membership restored and he was rehabilitated
1963-1968: scientific employee of the State and Law Institute of the Slovak Academy of Sciences
1969 (April)-1987 (December): chief commander of the Popular Militia
1971 (January)-1987 (December): president and member of the Presidium of the National Front Central Committee

See also 
Husakism
Husák's Children
History of Czechoslovakia
Lennon Wall

References

Literature 
 MACHÁČEK, Michal. Gustáv Husák. Prague : Vyšehrad 2017, 632 pp. .
 MACHÁČEK, Michal. The Strange Unity. Gustáv Husák and Power and Political Fights Inside the Communist Party of Czechoslovakia as Exemplified by Presidency Issue (1969–1975), in: Czech Journal of Contemporary History, 2016, vol. 4, 104–128 pp. .

 External links Speeches and Writings'', a publication from 1986.
 Kim Ir sen v Praze 1984/Kim Il-sung in Prague 1984

|-

|-

|-

 
1913 births
1991 deaths
Politicians from Bratislava
People from the Kingdom of Hungary
Leaders of the Communist Party of Czechoslovakia
Presidents of Czechoslovakia
Members of the Interim National Assembly of Czechoslovakia
Members of the Constituent National Assembly of Czechoslovakia
Members of the National Assembly of Czechoslovakia (1948–1954)
Members of the Chamber of the Nations of Czechoslovakia (1969–1971)
Members of the Chamber of the People of Czechoslovakia (1971–1976)
Communist Party of Slovakia (1939) politicians
Prime Ministers of Slovakia
Prague Spring
People of the Cold War
People of the Velvet Revolution
Czechoslovak prisoners sentenced to life imprisonment
Prisoners sentenced to life imprisonment by Czechoslovakia
Comenius University alumni
Heroes of the Czechoslovak Socialist Republic
Foreign Heroes of the Soviet Union
Grand Crosses of the Order of Polonia Restituta
Collaborators with the Soviet Union
Recipients of the Order of Georgi Dimitrov
Recipients of the Order of Lenin
Czechoslovak Socialist Republic rehabilitations